The 1941 All-Eastern football team consists of American football players chosen by various organizations for All-Eastern teams at the conclusion of the 1941 college football season. The organizations selecting teams in 1941 included the Associated Press (AP).

The 1941 Fordham Rams football team, ranked No. 6 in the final AP Poll, placed three players on the AP first and second teams: back Steve Filipowicz (AP-1); end Jim Lansing (AP-2); and guard Larry Sartori (AP-2).

The 1941 Navy Midshipmen football team, ranked No. 10 in the final AP Poll, also placed three players: back Bill Busik (AP-1) and tackles Bill Chewning (AP-1) and Gene Flathmann (AP-2).

The 1941 Duquesne Dukes football team, ranked No. 8 in the final AP Poll, placed two players: end John Rokisky (AP-1) and center Al DeMao (AP-2).

All-Eastern selections

Backs
 Gene Davis, Penn (AP-1)
 Andy Tomasic, Temple (AP-1)
 Bill Busik, Navy (AP-1)
 Steve Filipowicz, Fordham (AP-1)
 Edgar Jones, Pittsburgh (AP-2)
 Paul Governali, Columbia (AP-2)
 Henry Mazur, Army (AP-2)
 Len Krouse, Penn State (AP-2)

Ends
 John Rokisky, Duquesne (AP-1)
 Loren MacKinney, Harvard (AP-1)
 Jim Lansing, Fordham (AP-2)
 Bernie Kuczynski, Penn (AP-2)

Tackles
 Bill Chewning, Navy (AP-1)
 Al Blozis, Georgetown (AP-1)
 Gene Flathmann, Navy (AP-2)
 Hank Zajkowski, Temple (AP-2)

Guards
 Endicott Peabody, Harvard (AP-1)
 Ralph Fife, Pittsburgh (AP-1)
 Dick Weber, Syracuse (AP-2)
 Larry Sartori, Fordham (AP-2)

Centers
 Ed Korisky, Villanova (AP-1)
 Al DeMao, Duquesne (AP-2)

Key

AP = Associated Press

See also
1941 College Football All-America Team

References

All-Eastern football team
All-Eastern college football teams